Chankayurt (Ҫ̇änka-Yurt) is a rural locality (a selo) in Adil-Yangiyurtovsky Selsoviet, Babayurtovsky District, Republic of Dagestan, Russia. The population was 387 as of 2010. There are 5 streets. Selo was founded in 1857.

References 

Rural localities in Babayurtovsky District